Battle of Ukino (July 12, 1558) was the final victory of Oda Nobunaga in his struggle to unite the province of Owari against his cousin, Oda Nobukata, deputy governor of northern Owari.

Background 

After defeating Imagawa clan of Suruga in the battle of Muraki and capturing southern provincial capital of Kiyosu (both in 1554), Oda Nobunaga united the Southern Owari under his rule. In 1555, Saitō Dōsan, Nobunaga's father in law and ally, retired as the lord of Mino Province (north of Owari) for his eldest son, Saitō Yoshitatsu. However, on January 4, 1556. Yoshitatsu killed his two brothers, leading to a military conflict with his father. Nobunaga supported Dōsan, but Yoshitatsu defeated and killed him in battle in April 1556.

Seeing the fall of Nobunaga's father in law as an opportunity, Oda Nobuyasu of Iwakura Castle concluded a pact with Yoshitatsu and opened hostilities against Nobunaga.

After resolving internal struggle and rebellion in his own family, defeating his younger brother Oda Nobuyuki who supported by  Oda Nobuyasu in the battle of Ino (in 1556), Nobunaga was firmly established as the ruler of the southern Owari, while the northern part of the province was still the domain of his cousin, Oda Nobukata (successor of Oda Nobuyasu) of Iwakura castle, deputy governor of the northern Owari.

Battle 
Nobunaga with support of his cousin, Oda Nobukiyo of Inuyama, defeated the forces of the Oda Nobukata (the lineal successor of Nobuyasu) of Iwakura at Ukino in Owari on August 24, 1558 (Japanese calendar date: Eiroku era: 1st year, 7th month, 12th day). as result, Oda Nobukata retreat to Iwakura Castle.

Aftermath
In 1559, Nobunaga besieged, captured, and razed Iwakura Castle to the ground, ending the Iwakura branch of the Oda family and finally uniting the whole province of Owari under his rule. Later that year Nobunaga visited Kyoto and was received by Shogun Ashikaga Yoshiteru, gaining the formal appointment of deputy governor (shugodai) of Owari.

References

Literature 
 
 
 
 

Ukino
Ukino